The 2022–23 Lindenwood Lions men's basketball team represents Lindenwood University in the 2022–23 NCAA Division I men's basketball season. The Lions, led by fourth-year head coach Kyle Gerdeman, play their home games at Hyland Performance Arena in St. Charles, Missouri as members of the Ohio Valley Conference.

This season will mark Lindenwood's first year of a four-year transition period from Division II to Division I. As a result, the Lions are not eligible for NCAA postseason play until the 2026–27 season.

Previous season
The Lions finished the 2021–22 season 12–17, 8–12 in GLVC play to finish tied for third place in the Central Division. They were defeated by William Jewell in the first round of the GLVC tournament.

Roster

Schedule and results

|-
!colspan=12 style=| Non-conference regular season

|-
!colspan=12 style=| OVC regular season

Sources

References

Lindenwood Lions men's basketball seasons
Lindenwood Lions
Lindenwood Lions men's basketball
Lindenwood Lions men's basketball